Bloxwich railway station serves  Bloxwich, in the Metropolitan Borough of Walsall, West Midlands, England.  The station, and all trains serving it, are operated by West Midlands Railway.

History
The present station opened in 1989, as part of the first stage of the reopening of the Chase Line from Walsall to Hednesford to passenger trains under British Rail.  An earlier Bloxwich station existed a few hundred yards to the south, just north of the level crossing and adjacent to the existing Bloxwich Signal Box (which in April 2011 retained its London Midland Region of British Railways white-on-maroon enamel sign). That station closed to passengers on 18 January 1965 and to goods on 10 August 1964.

Services
Typically, Monday to Saturday daytimes, Bloxwich is served by two trains per hour in each direction between Birmingham New Street and Rugeley Trent Valley where connections to Stafford, Stoke-on-Trent and Crewe are available, although a small number of trains (2 per day on weekdays) start/terminate at Hednesford. Services are usually operated by Class 350 electric trains. During the morning and evening peak, trains to Walsall and Birmingham run at a 30-minute frequency. Journey times are typically 7 minutes to Walsall and 31 minutes to Birmingham New Street.

References

External links

Railway stations in Walsall
DfT Category F2 stations
Former London and North Western Railway stations
1858 establishments in England
Railway stations in Great Britain opened in 1858
Railway stations in Great Britain closed in 1965
Railway stations in Great Britain opened in 1989
Railway stations served by West Midlands Trains
Beeching closures in England
Reopened railway stations in Great Britain